HMS E10 was a British E class submarine built by Vickers, Barrow-in-Furness. She was laid down on 10 July 1912 and was commissioned on 10 March 1914. She costed £105,700. E10 was lost in the North Sea on or around 18 January 1915.

Design
She was powered by two  Vickers eight-cylinder two-stroke diesel engines and two  electric motors.

As with most of the early E class boats, E10 was not fitted with a deck gun during construction, and it is not known whether one was fitted later, as was the case with boats up to E19. She had five 18 inch (450 mm) torpedo tubes, two in the bow, one either side amidships, and one in the stern; a total of 10 torpedoes were carried.

E-Class submarines had wireless systems with  power ratings; in some submarines, these were later upgraded to  systems by removing a midship torpedo tube. Their maximum design depth was  although in service some reached depths of below . Some submarines contained Fessenden oscillator systems.

Crew
Her complement was three officers and 28 men.

References

Bibliography

 Akerman, P. (1989). Encyclopaedia of British submarines 1901–1955.  p. 150. Maritime Books.

External links
 'Submarine losses 1904 to present day' - Royal Navy Submarine Museum 

 

British E-class submarines of the Royal Navy
Ships built in Barrow-in-Furness
1913 ships
World War I submarines of the United Kingdom
World War I shipwrecks in the North Sea
Lost submarines of the United Kingdom
Royal Navy ship names
Maritime incidents in 1915